Robert Bloom (May 3, 1908February 13, 1994) was an oboist with an orchestral and solo career, a composer and arranger contributing to the oboe repertory, and a teacher of several successful oboists. Bloom is considered seminal in the development of an American school of oboe playing.

At the Curtis Institute of Music Bloom was a pupil of Marcel Tabuteau for three years. In the 1930s he played English horn in the Philadelphia Orchestra under Leopold Stokowski and first oboe in the Rochester Philharmonic under José Iturbi. He was the principal oboe in Arturo Toscanini's NBC Symphony Orchestra from 1937 to 1943. Bloom plays on recordings by the Columbia Symphony and the RCA Symphony.

In 1946 Bloom was one of the founding members of the Bach Aria Group, with which he played until 1980. Recordings by the Bach Aria Group featuring Bloom started appearing from the late 1940s. Bloom transcribed and elaborated 18th-century masterworks for the oboe. His own compositions include a Sonatina for oboe and piano.

Bloom was a professor at Yale and Juilliard. His pupils include William Bennett, Bill Douglas, Tim Hurtz, Richard Killmer, Bert Lucarelli, Ray Still, Allan Vogel, Stephen Taylor, and [[Richcolleagues, and former pupils gathered in Lincoln Center's Alice Tully Hall in New York for an 80th-birthday tribute.

A few years after Bloom's death in 1994, his widow, Sara Lambert Bloom, published The Robert Bloom Collection, scores and parts to his 21 editions of 18th-century masterworks, 10 transcriptions, and 10 compositions. The Art of Robert Bloom, a 7-CD set of live performances of concertos, chamber music, and Bach arias performed by Bloom over his 60-year career was released in 2001 on Boston Records label.

Bloom's daughter, Kath Bloom is a singer-songwriter and music therapist based in Litchfield, CT.

References

Further reading
 Bloom, Sara Lambert. "A Tribute to Robert Bloom". Double Reed, Volume 11, Number 3 (1988): 11–21.
 Bloom,  Sara Lambert (editor), with contributions and/or quotations from Julius Baker, Samuel Baron, Robert Bloom, Susan Eischeid, Jerome Hoberman, David McGill, Leopold Stokowski, Robert Stumpf II, Daniel Webster and others. Robert Bloom: The Story of a Working Musician. rdg, 2009. (Addenda and errata: 2012)  
 Burgess, Geoffrey. "Bloom, Robert" in The New Grove Dictionary of Music and Musicians. London: Macmillan Publishers. Second edition, 2001.
 Burgess, Geoffrey. "Bloom, Robert" in The Grove Dictionary of American Music, second edition, eight volumes. Oxford: Oxford University Press, 2013. .
 Galbraith, Amy M. The American School of Oboe Playing: Robert Bloom, John de Lancie, John Mack, and the Influence of Marcel Tabuteau. West Virginia University, 2011. 
 Schwartz, Norman. "The Pavarotti of the Oboe: Robert Bloom" in The Double Reed, Volume 28 Number 1 (2005).
 Woodhams, Richard. "Robert Bloom, Eminent American Oboist." in The Instrumentalist, Volume 44, Number 4 (December 1989): 24–30.

External links

American oboists
Male oboists
1908 births
1994 deaths
20th-century American male musicians